German submarine U-143 was a Type IID U-boat of Nazi Germany's Kriegsmarine during World War II. Her keel was laid down on 3 January 1940 by Deutsche Werke in Kiel as yard number 272. She was launched on 10 August 1940 and commissioned on 18 September under Kapitänleutnant Ernst Mengerson.

U-143 began her service life with the 1st U-boat Flotilla. She spent the rest of the war as a training vessel.

Design
German Type IID submarines were enlarged versions of the original Type IIs. U-143 had a displacement of  when at the surface and  while submerged. She had two shafts and two  propellers.

U-143 was fitted with three  torpedo tubes at the bow, five torpedoes or up to twelve Type A torpedo mines, and a  anti-aircraft gun. The boat had a complement of 25.

Operational career

First patrol
U-143s first patrol took her along the Norwegian coast, before crossing the North Sea and passing through the gap between the Faroe and Shetland Islands towards Iceland.

Second and third patrols
Following a transit voyage from Bergen in Norway, she left Kiel on 9 June 1941, travelling to much the same area as on her first sortie.

Her third foray was equally uneventful.

Fourth patrol and fate

She surrendered on 5 May 1945 in Heligoland, was transferred to Wilhelmshaven and then to Loch Ryan for Operation Deadlight.

Summary of raiding history

References

Bibliography

External links

German Type II submarines
U-boats commissioned in 1940
U-boats sunk in 1945
World War II submarines of Germany
1940 ships
Ships built in Kiel
Operation Deadlight
Maritime incidents in December 1945